Outside Inside may refer to:
 Outsideinside, a 1968 album by Blue Cheer
 Outside Inside (The String Cheese Incident album), 2001
 Outside Inside (The Tubes album), 1983
 "Outside-Inside" (song), by Gigolo Aunts, from their 1988 album Everybody Happy
 "Outside Inside", by Matt Brouwer from his 2012 album Till the Sunrise

See also 
 Inside Outside (disambiguation)